The 1981 Icelandic Cup was the 22nd edition of the National Football Cup.

It took place between 26 May 1980 and 30 August 1981, with the final played at Laugardalsvöllur in Reykjavik. The cup was important, as winners qualified for the UEFA Cup Winners' Cup (if a club won both the league and the cup, the defeated finalists would take their place in the Cup Winners' Cup).

The 10 clubs from the 1. Deild entered in the last 16, with clubs from lower tiers entering in the three preliminary rounds. Teams played one-legged matches. In case of a draw, the match was replayed at the opposition's ground.

The final was a rematch of the previous season - Fram Reykjavik and ÍBV Vestmannaeyjar meeting, but on this occasion it was the club from Vestmannaeyjar who qualified for Europe. IBV won the Icelandic Cup for the fourth time.

First round

Second round

Third round

Fourth round 

 Entry of ten teams from the 1. Deild

Quarter finals

Semi finals

Final 

 ÍBV Vestmannaeyjar won their fourth Icelandic Cup and qualified for the 1982–83 European Cup Winners' Cup.

See also 

 1981 Úrvalsdeild
 Icelandic Men's Football Cup

External links 
  1980 Icelandic Cup results at the site of the Icelandic Football Federation

Icelandic Men's Football Cup
Iceland
1981 in Iceland